The Men's points race event of the 2009 UCI Track Cycling World Championships was held on 25 March 2009.

Results

References

External links
 Full results at tissottiming.com

Men's points race
UCI Track Cycling World Championships – Men's points race